Shafto is a surname. The Shafto family origins can be traced back to the Ffolliot family, who were established by the 14th century at Shafto Crag, Northumberland and adopted the alternative surname of Shafto. The following people have the name Shafto:

Bobby Shafto, 18th century British Member of Parliament (MP), the likeliest subject of a famous North East English folk song
Henry Shafto Harrison (1810–92) was a 19th-century Member of Parliament in Wanganui, New Zealand
Robert Duncombe Shafto (1796–1888), British Liberal Party politician
Robert Eden Duncombe Shafto (1776–1848), British politician from Whitworth Hall, Spennymoor, County Durham
Robert Shafto (1690–1729) (1690–1729), British politician from Whitworth Hall, Spennymoor, County Durham

See also
Bobby Shafto's Gone to Sea